Blood barrier may refer to:

 Blood–air barrier
 Blood–brain barrier
 Blood–ocular barrier
 Blood–retinal barrier
 Blood–testis barrier
 Blood–thymus barrier
 Blood-placental barrier